The Chinese ambassador to the European Union is the official representative of the government in Beijing to the European Commission.

List of representatives

See also
China–European Union relations

References 

 
European Union
China